Aromatic rice is one of the major types of rice. It is a medium- to long-grained rice. It is known for its nutty aroma and taste, which is caused by the chemical compound 2-acetyl-1-pyrroline. Varieties of aromatic rice include Ambemohar, Basmati, Jasmine, Sona Masuri, Texmati, Tulaipanji, Tulshimala, Wehani, Kalijira, Chinigura, Gobindobhog, Kali Mooch and wild Pecan rice.
 When cooked, the grains have a light and fluffy texture except for Gobindobhog rice which is sticky in texture.

References

Further reading
  R.K. Singh, U.S. Singh and G.S. Khush (editors). (2000). Aromatic rices. New Delhi : Oxford & IBH Pub. Google Books.

Rice varieties